Jonas Tenbrock (born 16 December 1995) is a German former professional cyclist.

References

External links

1995 births
Living people
German male cyclists
People from Bocholt, Germany
Sportspeople from Münster (region)
Cyclists from North Rhine-Westphalia